David Charles Cowen (June 12, 1897 – May 1, 1975) was an American politician in the state of Washington. He served in the Washington House of Representatives and Washington State Senate. He died of heart disease in 1975.

References

1897 births
1975 deaths
Democratic Party members of the Washington House of Representatives
20th-century American politicians
Democratic Party Washington (state) state senators